The Fête de la Musique, also known in English as Music Day, Make Music Day or World Music Day, is an annual music celebration that takes place on 21 June. On Music Day, citizens and residents are urged to play music outside in their neighborhoods or in public spaces and parks. Free concerts are also organized, where musicians play for fun and not for payment.

The first all-day musical celebration on the day of the summer solstice was originated by Jack Lang, then Minister of Culture of France, as well as by Maurice Fleuret; it was celebrated in Paris in 1982. Music Day later became celebrated in 120 countries around the world.

History
In October 1981, Maurice Fleuret became Director of Music and Dance at the French Ministry of Culture at Jack Lang's request. He applied his reflections to the musical practice and its evolution: "the music everywhere and the concert nowhere". When he discovered, in a 1982 study on the cultural habits of the French, that five million people, one young person out of two, played a musical instrument, he began to dream of a way to bring people out on the streets. It first took place in 1982 in Paris as the Fête de la Musique.

Ever since, the festival has become an international phenomenon, celebrated on the same day in more than 700 cities in 120 countries, including India, Germany, Italy, Greece, Russia, Australia, Peru, Brazil, Ecuador, Mexico, Canada, the United States, the UK, and Japan.

Purpose
Fête de la Musique's purpose is to promote music in two ways:
 Amateur and professional musicians are encouraged to perform in the streets, under the slogan "Faites de la musique" ("Make music"), a homophone of Fête de la musique
 Many free concerts are organized, making all genres of music accessible to the public. Two of the caveats to being sanctioned by the official Fête de la Musique organization in Paris are that all concerts must be free to the public, and all performers donate their time free of charge. This is true of most participating cities as well. 

Despite there being a large tolerance by the general public about the performance of music by amateurs in public areas after the usual hours, noise restrictions still apply and can cause some establishments to be forbidden to remain open and broadcast music out of their doors without prior authorization. This means that the prefectures of police in France can still forbid individuals, groups, or establishments to install any audio hardware in the street.

Reach and impact

Over 120 countries participate in Fête de la musique and over 1,000 cities participate across the world. In the United States alone, there are 82 cities participating. 

The goal of Fête de la Musique, or Make Music Day, is to provide thousands of free concerts throughout the day. Public areas are brimming with live music and participatory music making opportunities.

See also
 Music Day UK
 World music

References

External links

 The French Culture Ministry's website on the Fête de la Musique (in French, international section also available in English)

June observances
Music festivals in France
Music festivals established in 1981
Events in Paris